The 2022 San Diego State Aztecs football team represented the San Diego State University as a member of the Mountain West Conference during the 2022 NCAA Division I FBS football season. They were led by head coach Brady Hoke, who was coaching his fourth season with the team. The Aztecs played their home games at the new Snapdragon Stadium in San Diego, California.

Schedule
San Diego State and the Mountain West Conference announced the 2022 football schedule on February 16, 2022.

Game summaries

Arizona

Idaho State

at No. 14 Utah

Toledo

at Boise State

Hawaii

at Nevada

at Fresno State

UNLV

San Jose State

at New Mexico

Air Force

vs. Middle Tennessee (Hawaii Bowl)

Rankings

References

San Diego State
San Diego State Aztecs football seasons
San Diego State Aztecs football